Chowk Azam is a city in the Layyah District of Punjab, Pakistan. Chowk Azam has an estimated population of more than 150,000 people. The city has many educational and vocational institutions, including the Government Muslim High School, Divisional Public School, Government College for Boys and Government College for Girls. The campus of the Government College University Faisalabad and Bahauddin Zakariya University in Layyah provides point services for the commuting of Chowk Azam students and others who live in the vicinity.

History

According to popular legend, the history of Chowk Azam dates back to the 14th century, when a conflict between the ruling king of Afghanistan and his brother arose over the crown and throne. Taking with him a caravan of Muslim and Christian allies, the king's brother fled the country in the hope of receiving political asylum from the king of India. He brought his entire household, including courtesans, slaves, and cattle. Hearing of the exodus, the king of Afghanistan pursued the caravan with his armed forces. They attacked at the Sindharr clan's thatched house, which is said to have been located where Habib Bank Limited is today. The king's forces engulfed the departed caravan and slaughtered the men, women, children and cattle. It is claimed that the well in which they deposited the dismembered bodies of the dead was so full, blood gushed out of it, giving way to it being formally named "Khooni Chowk". 

Later, when Colonel Muhammad Azam arrived, he purchased the land. He built a mosque that is the central mosque of the city today; this led it to be named after Colonel Azam and called Chowk Azam.

The city's inhabitants consist mainly of Punjabi, Saraiki, Pashtun, and Rohitky communities, with the majority being Punjabi. Punjabi people came to this region in the pre and post-partition era. Agricultural peasants migrated from upper and central Punjab, mainly from Sialkot, Gujrat, Gujranwala, Lahore, Faisalabad and Narowal, and settled in Chowk Azam to expand their businesses there.

Chowk Azam, Pakistan is location at a latitude of 30.9706551 and a longitude of 71.212303.

References

 https://www.latlong.net/place/chowk-azam-pakistan-4160.html

Populated places in Layyah District
Cities in Punjab (Pakistan)